Semecarpus gardneri is a species of plant in the  family Anacardiaceae. It is endemic to Sri Lanka.

References

Flora of Sri Lanka
gardneri
Vulnerable plants
Taxonomy articles created by Polbot